Podoscirtinae is a subfamily of crickets in the family Gryllidae.

Tribes and Genera 
The Orthoptera Species File lists:

Aphonoidini 
Auth.: Gorochov, 2008
 subtribe Diatrypina Desutter-Grandcolas, 1988 – South America
 Diatrypa Saussure, 1874
 genus group Aphonoides Gorochov, 2008 – Africa, E. Asia, Australia
 Aphonoides Chopard, 1940
 Exomunda Gorochov, 2007
 Furcimunda Gorochov, 2007
 Zamunda Gorochov, 2007
 genus group Deinutona Gorochov, 2008
 Deinutona Gorochov, 2008
 Paputona Gorochov, 2008
 genus group Mistshenkoana Gorochov, 2008
 Dinomunda Gorochov, 2007
 Mistshenkoana Gorochov, 1990
 genus group Protomunda Gorochov, 2008
 Brevimunda Gorochov, 2007
 Protomunda Gorochov, 2007
 genus group Unka Gorochov, 2008
 Pseudounka Gorochov, 2008
 Unka Otte & Alexander, 1983
 genus group not assigned
 Aphasius – monotypic – A. ritsemae Saussure, 1878
 Corixogryllus Bolívar, 1900
 Gryllaphonus Chopard, 1951
 Munda (insect) Stål, 1877
 Umbulgaria Otte & Alexander, 1983
 Utona Gorochov, 1986

Podoscirtini 
Auth.: Saussure, 1878 – Global tropics & subtropics

 genus group Dolichogryllus Gorochov, 2005
 Acrophonus Bolívar, 1910
 Afrotruljalia Gorochov, 2005
 Depressotrella Gorochov, 2005
 Dolichogryllus Bolívar, 1910
 Eumadasumma Chopard, 1934
 Hemitruljalia Gorochov, 2005
 Pachyaphonus Chopard, 1954
 Pseudotruljalia Gorochov, 2005
 genus group Hemiphonus Otte & Alexander, 1983
 Hemiphonus Saussure, 1878
 Riatina Otte & Alexander, 1983
 genus group Madasumma Otte & Alexander, 1983
 Madasumma Walker, 1869
 Tamborina Otte & Alexander, 1983
 genus group Podoscirtus Saussure, 1878
 Atruljalia Gorochov, 1988
 Eupodoscirtus Gorochov, 2004
 Fryerius Uvarov, 1940
 Kilimagryllus Sjöstedt, 1910
 Malgasotrella Gorochov, 2004
 Neozvenella Gorochov, 2004
 Podoscirtus Serville, 1838
 Spinotrella Gorochov, 2004
 Stenotrella Gorochov, 2005
 Ultratrella Gorochov, 2004
 Zvenellomorpha Gorochov, 2004
 genus group not assigned
 Abaxitrella Gorochov, 2002
 Adenopterus Chopard, 1951
 Allotrella Gorochov, 2006
 Anaudus Saussure, 1874
 Anisotrypus Saussure, 1878
 Atrella Gorochov, 2003
 Calscirtus Otte, 1987
 Furcitrella Gorochov, 2002
 Hemiphonoides Chopard, 1951
 Hemitrella Gorochov, 2003
 Heterecous Saussure, 1897
 Homalotrypus Brancsik, 1896
 Indotrella Gorochov, 2003
 Insulascirtus Otte & Rentz, 1985
 Matuanus Gorochov, 1986
 Mnesibulus Stål, 1877
 Nessa (insect) Walker, 1869
 Noctitrella Gorochov, 1990
 Ombrotrella Gorochov, 2006
 Parametrypa Brunner von Wattenwyl, 1873
 Paranaudus Saussure, 1878
 Phyllotrella Gorochov, 1988
 Podoscirtodes Chopard, 1956
 Poliotrella Gorochov, 1988
 Posus Bolívar, 1890
 Prozvenella Gorochov, 2002
 Pseudomadasumma Shiraki, 1930
 Rupilius Stål, 1876
 Scepastus Gerstaecker, 1863
 Sonotrella Gorochov, 1988
 Stenaphonus Saussure, 1878
 Trelleora Gorochov, 1988
 Truljalia Gorochov, 1985
 Valiatrella Gorochov, 2005
 Varitrella Gorochov, 2003
 Xuanwua He & Gorochov, 2015
 Zvenella Gorochov, 1988

Tribe incertae sedis 
 †Allopterites – monotypic – A. multilineatus Cockerell, 1920
 Archenopterus Otte, 1987
 Dicerorostrum  – monotypic – D. diceros Gorochov, 2017
 †Eneopterotrypus – monotypic – E. chopardi Zeuner, 1937
 Pixipterus Desutter-Grandcolas, 2016
 Stenoecanthus – monotypic – S. gracillimus Chopard, 1912
 †Stenogryllodes – monotypic – S. brevipalpis Chopard, 1936

References

Further reading

External links
 

Crickets